Feride Çetin (born 5 November 1980) is a Turkish actress. She has appeared in more than ten films since 2005.

Selected filmography

References

External links 

1980 births
Living people
Turkish film actresses
Turkish television actresses